Trivandrum Lodge is a 2012 Indian Malayalam-language drama film directed by V. K. Prakash, written by Anoop Menon, and produced by P. A. Sebastian. The film stars Jayasurya, Anoop Menon and Honey Rose, and features P. Balachandran and P. Jayachandran in supporting roles. The film features music composed by M. Jayachandran, whilst cinematography is handled by Pradeep Nair and the film is edited by Mahesh Narayanan.

The film was released in theatres on 20 September. It received mixed to positive reviews from critics. The film was a commercial success at the box office.

Plot
Trivandrum Lodge, situated in Kochi and its inmates form the backdrop of the film. Abdu is a man who does odd jobs for living including being masseur at a spa and being the driver of a wealthy businessman. He is also obsessed about sex, being sex-starved. Shibu Vellayani is a cinema reporter who works with a not-so-well-known film magazine, and persuades women to sleep with him for roles in films. Kora is a retired clerk from the secretariat who boasts about having had sex with 999 women in his life and who wishes to have a policewoman as his 1000th. Satheeshan, wants to be an actor. Shibu promises to help him and has even given Satheeshan a new name, Sagar. Arthur Relton and Peggy Aunty are the oldest inmates. Relton teaches piano and lives in the world of music while Peggy Aunty runs a canteen inside the lodge.

The owner of the lodge is Ravisankar, a rich widower who has a son Arjun. Ravisankar's mother was a to many rich men and all his wealth basically comes from her earnings. This caused Ravisankar's father Narayanan to move away from the family years before. He runs a small hotel, away from his son's world.

It is into this world of Ravi, Narayanan and all the inmates of Trivandrum Lodge that Dhwani makes her entry. She is divorced, wants to be free, eat good food and as she herself says, "fornicate with abandon". Dhwani comes to stay at Trivandrum Lodge, aiming to write a novel with Kochi as the backdrop. Her intentions not so honourable, the sexually-repressed souls of Trivandrum lodge go into a tizzy. Then on Dhwani and Abdu have a deep affectionate love, after she pays Abdu to act as her lover in a hotel room to stop her husband from asking her to take him back.

The film also discusses in detail the adolescent romance between Arjun and his classmate Amala, the unconditional romance between Ravisankar and his wife Malavika, who has died. Dhwani is fascinated by his ability to stay true to one woman even after she passes away and the broken love story of Relton and Peggy.

Cast

Production

After the bumper success of the movie Beautiful, director V. K. Prakash wanted to meet the audience with another feel good movie. Trivandrum Lodge brings together the key names behind Beautiful once again. While Anoop Menon was in charge of the scripts and was to play a pivotal role, Jayasurya came up in the lead role. Trivandrum Lodge combines elements of off-color humor. It follows the lives of the residents in a lodge and their relationships. According to the director, "it is a tale of love, lust and longing set in a lodge."

Casting
Jayasurya was chosen to be play the character without further remarks, initially Padmapriya was chosen to play the female lead, but opted out after some changes in the script because she believed there was very little scope for her to perform.
Rumours said that the role was later given to Meghana Raj, but the role was actually given to Honey Rose who came through with a different character as Dhwani by the film.
The film marked a comeback of sorts for veteran singer Jayachandran who had previously acted in 80s films such as Nakhakshathangal and Lekhayude Maranam Oru Flashback. Writer P. Balachandran and singer Nikhil also appear in major supporting roles. Bhavana was cast to play a very small cameo role as the wife of the Anoop Menon's character in the film, and that the actress had agreed to do it readily. Devi Ajith was cast after a big break to play Zarina, a close friend of Dhwani. Thesni Khan plays Kanyaka, a role she herself enacted in V. K. Prakash's 2011 film Beautiful. Babu Namboothiri plays Thangal, a professional pimp, reprising the famous role he played in Padmarajan's cult classic Thoovanathumbikal, which was acclaimed by viewers.

Filming
The film began its shoot and held its pooja or launch on 22 April 2012 in Fort Kochi, while other locations are Mattancherry and Thiruvananthapuram.  Cinematography was done by Pradeep Narayanan to mark this first in Malayalam cinema, while Aravind operates the helicam. The film was the first ever film to have scenes shot by the helicam, which is a mix of the two: a remote controlled mini-helicopter captures aerial shots with the help of a video camera.

Critical reception
The film opened to mixed to positive responses from critics. Sujit Chandra Kumar stated in his review for Deccan Chronicle: "While the director-scriptwriter duo succeeds in creating lively and well-developed characters, the plot fails to be gripping as it enters the most dramatic phase." Rating the film , the critic was all praise for the film's cinematography, music and the lead performances. Unni R. Nair of Kerala9.com rated the film  and concluded his review calling the film, "Different, bold, well-scripted, well-directed and with good performances." Sify.com gave a verdict of "below average" and went on to tell "A disturbingly offensive film, which frequently crosses every limit of decency under the guise of bold experiments". Paresh C. Palicha of Rediff.com rated the film  and said, "Trivandrum Lodge is a frank retelling of people's cravings and desires and if not entirely successful, it does have something going for it." Aswin J. Kumar of The Times of India rated the film  and concluded his review saying, "Trivandrum Lodge commands interest not because it displays bluntness with regard to love and lust, but remains honest in its narrative." Nowrunning.com and Indiaglitz.com also gave the film average reviews.

Box office
The film collected 1,887 from the UK box office.

Awards
2nd South Indian International Movie Awards 
 SIIMA Award for Best Actress in a Supporting Role - Thesni Khan

 Asiavision Movie Awards 2012
 Second Best Actor - Jayasurya
 Trendsetter of the Year - Anoop Menon
 Popular Media awards - Trivanrum Lodge 
 Master Dhananjay - Best Child Artist Asianet film award 2013
 Master Dhananjay - Best Child Artist Amritha TV award 2013

Soundtrack

The film's soundtrack features songs composed by M. Jayachandran. The audio release of the film was held on 5 September 2012. All the lead actors in film including Jayasurya, Honey Rose, Anoop Menon and other actors such as Dulquer Salmaan, Babu Antony, Aju Varghese, Bhagath Manuel, Gauthami Nair, as well as director Joshi attended the function and released the audio. The background score of the film is composed by Bijibal.

See also
 Off-color humor

References

External links
 

2012 films
2010s Malayalam-language films
Indian black comedy films
2012 romantic drama films
Films about virginity
Films shot in Thiruvananthapuram
Films scored by M. Jayachandran
Films shot in Kochi
Films directed by V. K. Prakash
2012 black comedy films
Indian romantic drama films